One Night Only is the third studio album from South African DJ duo Pascal & Pearce. It was released on 30 September 2013, by South African independent record label Just Music. It features collaborations with multiple artists, including LCNVL. and Ard Matthews.

Track listing

Personnel
Pascal & Pearce – primary artist
Pascal Ellinas – producer, engineer, primary artist
Dave Pearce – producer, engineer, primary artist
Gabrielle da Silva – vocalist
Andrew Chaplin – vocalist
Brian Chaplin – vocalist
Polina Griffith – vocalist
Matthew le Roux – vocalist
Daniel Baron – vocalist
Letoya Buthelezi – vocalist
Anna Daigneault  – vocalist
Louise Carver – vocalist
Matthew O'Connell – vocalist
 Mike Kelly – producer
Kyle Maclean – producer
Michelle Breeze – vocalist
Frank van Rooijen – producer
Andre Frauenstein – producer
Tasha Baxter – vocalist
Ard Matthews – vocalist

References

Pascal & Pearce albums
2013 albums